The Slovenian records in swimming are the fastest ever performances of swimmers from Slovenia, which are recognised and ratified by Plavalna Zveza Slovenije.

All records were set in finals unless noted otherwise.

Long Course (50 m)

Men

Women

Mixed relay

Short Course (25 m)

Men

Women

Mixed relay

References
General
Slovenian Records 21 December 2022 updated
Specific

External links
Plavalna Zveza Slovenije web site

Slovenia
Records
Swimming
Swimming